was a Japanese sociolinguist, He was the author of ことばと文化, translated into English as Words in Context.

Suzuki argued that:
 Sociolinguists do not pay enough attention to the subtle differences between word usage in different cultures.
 Japanese linguists have traditionally been too occupied with Western linguistic categories, which are less than effective in studying Japanese.

Bibliography
 (translated in English)
 Words in Context (ことばと文化, 1973) published in English as “Japanese and the Japanese: Words in Culture” first edition 1978
 (not translated in English, literal titles)
 閉された言語・日本語の世界 (A Closed Language – The World of Japanese, 1975)
 日本語と外国語 (The Japanese Language and Foreign Languages, 1990)
 日本語は国際語になりうるか (Can Japanese Become An International Language?, 1995)
 教養としての言語学 (Educational Linguistics, 1996)
 日本人はなぜ英語ができないか (Why Japanese Are Bad at English, 1999)
 人にはどれだけの物が必要か (How Many Things Does A Man Need?, 1999)
 英語はいらない？ (No Need For English?, 2000)
 日本・日本語・日本人 (Japan, Its Language and the People, 2001)
 日本人はなぜ日本を愛せないのか (Why Japanese Cannot Be Patriotic, 2005)
 (English works)
 A semantic analysis of present-day Japanese with particular reference to the role of Chinese characters (1963)
 Reflections on Japanese language and culture (1987)

References

External links
 Side-by-side English Translation of 役割の固定化と一元化 ("Role Definition and Unification") from ことばと文化

1926 births
2021 deaths
Linguists from Japan
Japanese scientists
Sociolinguists
Writers from Tokyo
Place of death missing